Whitsett Historic District may refer to:

Whitsett Historic District (Whitsett, North Carolina), listed on the National Register of Historic Places in Guilford County, North Carolina
Whitsett Historic District (Whitsett, Pennsylvania), listed on the National Register of Historic Places in Fayette County, Pennsylvania